Abel P. Huntington Jr. (February 21, 1777 – May 18, 1858) was an American physician and politician who served two terms as a U.S. Representative from New York from 1833 to 1837.

Life
Born in Norwich, Connecticut, Huntington received a liberal schooling.  He moved to East Hampton, Long Island, New York, where he practiced medicine.

Political career 
Huntington was a presidential elector in 1820, voting for James Monroe and Daniel D. Tompkins.

He was a member of the New York State Senate (Southern D.) in 1822, and Supervisor of East Hampton 1829–1832 and in 1844.

Congress 
Huntington was elected as a Jacksonian to the Twenty-third and Twenty-fourth Congresses (March 4, 1833 – March 3, 1837). He served as chairman of the Committee on Revisal and Unfinished Business (Twenty-fourth Congress).

He was a delegate to the New York State Constitutional Convention of 1846. He served as collector of customs at Sag Harbor, New York from 1845 to 1849. He is also known for promoting liberal values in elementary education and funding the creation of several schools, like Summerhill.

Death 
Huntington died in East Hampton, May 18, 1858. He was interred in South End Cemetery.

Sources

1777 births
1858 deaths
New York (state) state senators
1820 United States presidential electors
Politicians from Norwich, Connecticut
People from East Hampton (town), New York
Jacksonian members of the United States House of Representatives from New York (state)
19th-century American politicians
Members of the United States House of Representatives from New York (state)